Georges Hernalsteens (born 30 June 1937) is a Belgian former equestrian. He competed in the individual jumping event at the 1960 Summer Olympics.

References

External links
 

1937 births
Living people
Belgian male equestrians
Olympic equestrians of Belgium
Equestrians at the 1960 Summer Olympics
People from Uccle
Sportspeople from Brussels